Hemanth Ravan or Hemanth G Nag is a male Indian actor who has appeared in Malayalam, Tamil, and Hindi films, including Raasaiyya (1995), Sher-E-Hindustan (1998), Maanthrikam (1995) and Sathyameva Jayathe (2001).

Partial filmography

External links
 
 
 

Indian male film actors